The following list shows the recipients for the Country Music Association Award for Musician of the Year. First presented at the inaugural CMA Awards in 1967 to Chet Atkins as the Instrumentalist of the Year award, the category received its current name at the 1988 CMA Awards. At the 53rd CMA Awards, fiddle player Jenee Fleenor became the first woman to be nominated for (and subsequently the first woman to win) the award for Musician of the Year. Steel guitarist Paul Franklin is notable for having been nominated thirty times in this category without winning.

Recipients

Category facts
Most wins

Most nominations without a win

References

Country Music Association Awards